The men's ice hockey tournament at the 1994 Winter Olympics in Lillehammer, Norway, was the 18th Olympic Championship. Sweden won its first gold medal, becoming the sixth nation to ever win Olympic ice hockey gold. The tournament, held from February 12 to February 27, was played at the Fjellhallen in Gjøvik and the Håkons Hall in Lillehammer. There was no women's tournament at the Olympics until 1998.

Medalists

Qualification
The top eleven nations from the 1993 World Championships qualified directly.  To fill the twelfth spot, five nations were selected to compete:  The top two from Group B (Great Britain and Poland), the top nation from Group C (Latvia), the best Asian nation (Japan), and Slovakia.  This was the first IIHF event for Slovakia.

Preliminary round
All times are local (UTC+1).

Group A

Group B

Consolation round

9–12th place semifinals

Eleventh place game

Ninth place game

Playoff round

Bracket

Quarterfinals

5–8th place semifinals

Semifinals

Seventh place game

Fifth place game

Bronze medal game

Gold medal game

Gold medal game
An exciting gold medal game saw Sweden force overtime by tying the score with less than two minutes to go. After a scoreless overtime, the winner was determined by a shootout. The first five rounds saw two players for each side make their penalty shots (Nedved and Kariya for Canada and Forsberg and Svensson for Sweden). In the sixth round, both Nedved and Svensson missed their shots. Forsberg then scored on Canadian goaltender Hirsch to start the seventh round. Kariya took Canada's seventh round shot and was stopped by Swedish goaltender Salo—giving the Swedes the gold medal.

Commemorative Swedish stamp
In 1995, the Swedish postal service memorialized Forsberg's game winning shootout goal by issuing a commemorative stamp. Because goaltender Corey Hirsch would not grant permission for his likeness to be used on the stamp, he was 'disguised' by means of changing the color of his sweater and his player number.

Final ranking

Statistics and awards

Average age
Team France was the oldest team in the tournament, averaging 28 years. Team USA was the youngest team in the tournament, averaging 22 years and 11 months. Gold medalists team Sweden averaged 26 years and 6 months. Tournament average was 26 years and 3 months.

Leading scorers

GP = Games played; G = Goals; A = Assists; Pts = Points; PIM = Penalties in minutes; POS = PositionSource: eliteprospects.com

Media All-Stars
Goaltender:  Tommy Salo
Defencemen:  Brad Werenka,  Timo Jutila
Forwards:  Mats Näslund,  Peter Šťastný,  Patrik Juhlin

References

External links
Jeux Olympiques 1994
The 1994 Winter Olympics at Lillehammer – Chronological List of Events 

 
1994 Winter Olympics events
1994
Olympics, Winter
Sport in Gjøvik
1994